Shin Yon-ho (born 8 May 1964) is a South Korean footballer. He is currently manager of Korea University.

Playing career
While playing as a striker for South Korean under-20 team in the 1983 FIFA World Youth Championship, Shin attracted attention by scoring three goals including two goals in the quarter-final match against Uruguay. He played for senior national team in the 1984 Summer Olympics qualification after the World Youth Championship. However, he changed his role to a midfielder after suffering from arthritis during his university days.

Honours 
Korea University
Korean National Championship: 1985

Hyundai Horang-i
Korean National Championship runner-up: 1989
Korean League Cup runner-up: 1993

Hyundai Horang-i B
Korean President's Cup runner-up: 1990

South Korea U20
AFC Youth Championship: 1982

References

External links 
 
 
 Interview at KFA

1964 births
Living people
Association football forwards
South Korean footballers
Ulsan Hyundai FC players
K League 1 players
Korea University alumni
Association football midfielders